Mayacentrum is a genus of Thelyphonid whip scorpions, first described by Víquez and Armas in 2006.

Species 
, the World Uropygi Catalog accepts the following three species:

 Mayacentrum guatemalae Víquez & Armas, 2006 – Belize, Guatemala
 Mayacentrum pijol Víquez & Armas, 2006 – Guatemala, Honduras
 Mayacentrum tantalus (Roewer, 1954) – El Salvador, Guatemala

References 

Arachnid genera
Uropygi